
Gmina Wieluń is an urban-rural gmina (administrative district) in Wieluń County, Łódź Voivodeship, in central Poland.

Villages
Apart from the town of Wieluń, Gmina Wieluń contains the villages and settlements of Bieniądzice, Borowiec, Chodaki, Dąbrowa, Gaszyn, Jodłowiec, Kadłub, Klusiny, Krajków, Kurów, Ludwina, Małyszyn, Masłowice, Mokrosze, Nowy Świat, Olewin, Piaski, Ruda, Rychłowice, Sieniec, Srebrnica, Starzenice, Turów, Urbanice, Widoradz, Widoradz Dolny and Zwiechy.

Neighbouring gminas
Gmina Wieluń is bordered by the gminas of Biała, Czarnożyły, Mokrsko, Osjaków, Ostrówek, Pątnów, Skomlin and Wierzchlas.

References
Polish official population figures 2006

Wielun
Wieluń County